The Red Dice is a 1926 American silent crime drama film directed by William K. Howard and produced by Cecil B. DeMille. It stars Rod La Rocque and Marguerite De La Motte and was released through Producers Distributing Corporation.

Cast

Preservation
With no prints of Red Dice located in any film archives, it is a lost film. A 48 seconds trailer of the film still exists.

References

External links

1926 films
American silent feature films
Films directed by William K. Howard
Films based on American novels
Lost American films
American black-and-white films
American crime drama films
Producers Distributing Corporation films
1926 crime drama films
1926 lost films
Lost drama films
1920s American films
Silent American drama films
1920s English-language films